Geoffrey Alan Stuart Ozin FRSC is a British chemist, currently Tier 1 Canada Research Chair in Materials Chemistry and Distinguished University Professor at the University of Toronto. Ozin is the recipient of numerous awards for his research on nanomaterials, including the Meldola Medal and Prize in 1972 and the Rutherford Memorial Medal in 1982. He won the Albert Einstein World Award of Science in 2011, the Royal Society of Chemistry's Centenary Prize in 2015, and the Humboldt Prize in 2005 and 2019. He has co-founded three university spin-off companies: Torrovap in 1985, which manufactures metal vapor synthesis scientific instrumentation; Opalux in 2006, which develops tunable photonic crystals; and Solistra in 2019, which develops photocatalysts and photoreactors for hydrogen production from carbon dioxide and methane.

Early life and education 
Initially planning on entering the family fashion and tailor business, he entered King's College London in 1962, the first member of his family to attend university. Ozin graduated with a first-class honours degree in chemistry from King's College London in 1965, and obtained his PhD in inorganic chemistry at Oriel College, Oxford in 1967 with Prof. Ian R. Beattie. He then was an Imperial Chemical Industries postdoctoral fellow at the University of Southampton from 1967-1969. In 1969, he began his independent career at the University of Toronto as an Assistant Professor. He was promoted to Associate Professor in 1972, and full Professor in 1977.

References

1943 births
Living people
Alumni of King's College London
Alumni of Oriel College, Oxford
Academic staff of the University of Toronto
Canada Research Chairs
Albert Einstein World Award of Science Laureates
Fellows of the Royal Society of Chemistry
Inorganic chemists
Solid state chemists